Keisha Lynne Ellis is a Bahamian political scientist, known for her political and creative writing.

Early life
Ellis earned a master's degree in International Political Economy from the University of Kent, Brussels School of International Studies.

Career
Ellis is a political science lecturer at the University of the Bahamas. She wrote The People’s Constitution: A Layman’s Interpretation of the Constitution of The Bahamas after realizing that many of her students did not understand the underlying issues in the Bahamian referendum, 2002 and Bahamian constitutional referendum, 2016. The book is being used in classrooms. She was named a member of the Bahamas National Reparations Committee in 2014. This committee is tasked with establishing the case for reparations to Caribbean nations from former European colonial states for Native genocide and the effects of the transatlantic slave trade.

Ellis is also known for her creative writing. Her work was featured in Eighth National Exhibition (NE8) at the National Art Gallery of the Bahamas. She has been published in several online magazines and print collections. She is the Strategic Initiatives Manager at Hands for Hunger, an organization that redistributes food and reduces food waste.

Published works

References 

Year of birth missing (living people)
Living people
Bahamian women writers
Alumni of the University of Kent
Women political scientists
Academic staff of the University of the Bahamas
Bahamian academics